"Neopararhizobium haloflavum"  is a species of bacteria from the family Rhizobiaceae.

References

Hyphomicrobiales
Bacteria genera